Saint Teresa may refer to:

See List of saints named Teresa
St. Teresa, Florida, a town in the United States
Sainte-Thérèse, Quebec, a city in Quebec
"St. Teresa", a song by Joan Osborne from Relish

See also

 Teresa (disambiguation)
Sainte Thérèse (disambiguation)
Santa Teresa (disambiguation)
St. Theresa Church (disambiguation), the name of several churches
Saint Theresa's College (disambiguation), the name of several colleges
Saint Teresa's School (disambiguation), the name of several schools
Ecstasy of Saint Teresa, a sculpture in Rome